Stein Karlsen (born 1 September 1948) is a retired Norwegian football striker. He spent his career in Hamkam, and became league top goalscorer in 1973. Karlsen represented Norway as a senior international once.

References

External links
 

1948 births
Living people
Norwegian footballers
Hamarkameratene players
Norway international footballers
Association football forwards